The Laurentian Voyageurs women's basketball team represent Laurentian University in the Ontario University Athletics of U Sports women's basketball. The Voyageurs have also captured the OUA Critelli Cup conference title a total of 14 times, the last coming in 2000. Additionally, the program has won seven Bronze Baby trophies.

History

705 Challenge Cup
First established as a challenge between the varsity soccer teams of two Northern Ontario universities (Laurentian vs. Nipissing), in which the winning team was awarded the Riley Gallo Cup, the rivalry expanded. Introducing the 705 Challenge Cup in 2016, the results of all regular season games between the Lakers and the Voyageurs varsity teams for men’s and women’s basketball, ice hockey and soccer, comprised the overall won-loss record in determining the annual Cup winner. The Lakers would win their first 705 Challenge Cup during the 2019-20 athletics season. Of note, the scores below reflect the women's ice hockey matchups since the 705 Challenge Cup was introduced.

Season-by-season Record

Individual Leader Scoring

International
Carol Hamilton-Goodale  1986 FIBA World Championship for Women

Awards and honors
Basketball Ontario Hall of Fame - Class of 2006 Inductee: Carol Hamilton-Goodale

OUA Awards
Héléna Lamoureux: 2020 OUA Rookie of the Year

OUA All-Stars
1983-84 OUA East All-Star Team: Joy Bellinger
1982-83 OUA East All-Star Team: Joy Bellinger
1981-82 OUA East All-Star Team: Joy Bellinger

1980-81 OUA Tier One First Team All-Star: Joy Bellinger

OUA Showcase
2019 OUA Showcase Participant: Kayla Deschatelets, (Team Belanger)
2019 OUA Showcase Participant: Kayla Deschatelets, Bailey Tabin, (Team Belanger)
2018 OUA Showcase Participant: Emily Tinnes, (Team Burns)

U Sports Awards
1984-85 Nan Copp Award: Carol Hamilton Goodale

All-Canadian
1983-84 CIS Second Team All-Canadian: Joy Bellinger

All-Rookie
Héléna Lamoureux: 2020 U SPORTS Women's Basketball All-Rookie Team

Top 100
In celebration of the centennial anniversary of U SPORTS women’s basketball, a committee of U SPORTS women’s basketball coaches and partners revealed a list of the Top 100 women's basketball players. Commemorating the 100th anniversary of the first Canadian university women’s contest between the Queen’s Gaels and McGill Martlets on Feb. 6, 1920, the list of the Top 100 was gradually revealed over four weeks. Culminating with the All-Canadian Gala, which also recognized national award winners.

University honors
Héléna Lamoureux: 2020 Laurentian Female Athlete of the Year

Laurentian Hall of Fame
Class of 2014 Inductee: 1975-1976 Women's Basketball Team (National and Provincial Champions)
Class of 2012 Inductee: 1997-98 Women's Basketball Team (National and Provincial Champions)
Class of 2010 Inductee: 1990-91 Women's Basketball Team (National and Provincial Champions)
Class of 2012 Inductee: Stephanie Dongelmans (Harrison)
Class of 2008 Inductee: Carolyn Sturgess (Swords)
Class of 2006 Inductee: Angela MacDonald
Class of 2005 Inductee: Shirlene McLean
Class of 2004 Inductee: Kathy Shields
Class of 2003 Inductee: Susan Stewart
Class of 2001 Inductee: Diane Norman
Class of 1999 Inductee: Sandy Falco (Stevenson)
Class of 1997 Inductee: Pat Smith
Class of 1996 Inductee: Joy Louise Bellinger
Class of 1994 Inductee: Carol Hamilton-Goodale

Team Awards

References 

 U Sports women's basketball teams
Basketball teams in Ontario
Laurentian University
Women in Ontario